State Route 103 (SR 103) is a  state route that runs between Bluffton and Willard in the US state of Ohio. Most of the route is a rural two-lane highway and passes through both farmland and residential properties. In Bluffton the route has two interchanges with Interstate 75 (I–75).

The highway was first signed in 1923 on much the same alignment as today. In both 1935 and 1938 the route was extended east. The entire route was paved by 1939. Some of the highway replaced U.S. Route 25 (US 25), in 1964. SR 103 replaced the SR 194 and SR 298 designation of the highway from Chatfield to Willard, in 1969.

Route description
SR 103 begins at an interchange with I–75, on the south side of Bluffton. The route heads northwest as a two-lane highway crossing over a railroad track. The road passes through residential properties, before turning northeast towards downtown Bluffton. In downtown Bluffton the highway passes on the northwest side of Bluffton University, before the road turn toward the southeast. As the route heads southeast it passes over the railroad track again, followed by a curve due east. After the curve is the second interchange with I–75, in a commercial area of Bluffton. The highway passes the Bluffton Airport and leaves the village of Bluffton. East of Bluffton the route passes through farmland and has an intersection with SR 235, in rural Hancock County. The route enters Arlington, passing through mostly residential properties. In the center of the village SR 103 has an intersection with U.S. Route 68 (US 68).

East of the intersection with US 68, SR 103 has an at-grade railroad crossing, before leaving Arlington. The highway passes through farmland and begins a concurrency with SR 37, on the south side of Mount Blanchard. The concurrency heads north through Mount Blanchard, before SR 103 turns due east, just north of the town. SR 103 heads east, until a sharp turn due north. Followed by a second turn due east. As the highway nears Carey it begins to curve northeast. The route enters Carey at en interchange with US 23 and SR 15. SR 103 continues northeast concurrent with US 23, passing residential properties on its way to downtown. In downtown Carey SR 103 leaves US 23 and heads southeast concurrent with SR 199. The concurrency passes more residential properties and has an at-grade railroad. The route leaves SR 199 heading due east and leaves the town of Carey soon after.

East of Carey, SR 103 heads east passes farmland, with some woodland. The route has a T-intersection with SR 53, near Tymochtee. SR 103 turns northeast onto SR 53, until SR 103 turns due east. The highway heads east through mostly farmland, before entering Sycamore. On the east side of Sycamore SR 103, begins a concurrency with SR 67. In the center of the Village SR 67 turns due north onto SR 231, with SR 103 still heading east, concurrent with SR 231. The concurrency leaves Sycamore and enter rural Wyandot County, where SR 231 leaves SR 103 heading due south. SR 103 crosses into Crawford County. The highway heads towards Chatfield, passing  through a very short concurrency with SR 100 and an intersection with SR 19.

In Chatfield SR 103, turns northeast concurrent with SR 4. The concurrency passes through the center of the village, before SR 103 turns due east, leaving SR 4. The route heads due east toward New Washington, passing through farmland. On the west side of New Washington the highway curves southeast, before curving back due east, passing through residential properties. In downtown the route turns due south, passing commercial properties and having an intersection with SR 602. At the intersection with SR 602, SR 103 turns southeast and SR 602 continues due south. The roadway passes more residential properties, before leaving New Washington. The route heads east through farmland, having an intersection with SR 39, before turning due north in rural Crawford County. The highway heads due north, until the Crawford–Huron county line, where SR 103 turns due east. SR 103 heads east as the county line, before turning due north towards Willard.

SR 103 enters Willard from the south, passing the Willard Municipal Airport and passing through commercial properties. The road has an intersection with US 224, before heading through residential properties. The route enters downtown Willard as Main Street and makes a sharp turn due east onto Tiffin Street. Tiffin Street heads east through residential properties having an at-grade railroad crossing and an intersection with SR 99. East of the intersection with SR 99, SR 103 has an intersection with SR 598, before leaving Willard. East of Willard the highway passes through farmland, having an intersection with SR 61. The intersection with SR 61 is the western terminus of SR 103.

The section of SR 103 that is concurrent with US 23 is part of the National Highway System, a system of routes important for the nation's economy, mobility and defense.

History
SR 103 was originally signed in 1923, between Bluffton and Carey. In 1935 the route was extended east to an intersection with SR 53 near Tymochtee. The route was extended east to an intersection with SR 4 near Chatfield in 1938. The whole route was paved by 1939. Between 1962 and 1964, I–75 was built and open between Bluffton and Cygnet. US 25 ran concurrent with I–75, leaving SR 103 to replace US 103 through the south side of Bluffton. By 1969, its eastern terminus was extended to its current location, replacing the now defunct route numbers 194 and 298. No significant changes have taken place to this state route since 1969.

Major intersections

References

External links

State Route 103 Endpoint Photos

103
Transportation in Allen County, Ohio
Transportation in Hancock County, Ohio
Transportation in Wyandot County, Ohio
Transportation in Crawford County, Ohio
Transportation in Huron County, Ohio